Bobo is an unincorporated community in Quitman County, Mississippi. Bobo is located on U.S. Route 278 and Mississippi Highway 6, northeast of Marks.

References

Unincorporated communities in Quitman County, Mississippi
Unincorporated communities in Mississippi